Tom Lonergan may refer to:

Tom and Eileen Lonergan, divers
Tom Lonergan (footballer) (born 1984), Australian rules footballer with the Geelong Football Club